The Tarawa class is a ship class of Landing Helicopter Assault (LHA) type amphibious assault ships operated by the United States Navy (USN). Five ships were built by Ingalls Shipbuilding between 1971 and 1980; another four ships were planned, but later canceled; instead they were joined by the s.

, all vessels had been decommissioned. The Tarawa class were replaced by the s from 2014 onward while the Wasp class remains in service.

Design

Propulsion is provided by two Combustion Engineering boilers, connected to two Westinghouse turbines. These supply  to the ship's two propeller shafts. In addition to the main propulsion system, the ships are fitted with a bow thruster.

As of 1998, the ships' armament consisted of a Mark 49 RAM surface-to-air missile system, two Vulcan Phalanx close-in weapons systems, six Mark 242 25 mm automatic cannons, and eight 12.7 mm machine guns. Previously, the amphibious warships were fitted with 2 Mark 25 Sea Sparrow missile systems (which were replaced by the Phalanx units), and three 5-inch (127 mm) Mk 45 lightweight guns in bow and starboard aft sponsons (the guns were removed across the class during 1997 and 1998). Countermeasures and decoys include four Mark 36 SRBOC launchers, a SLQ-25 Nixie towed torpedo decoy, a Sea Gnat unit, SLQ-49 chaff decoys.

The number of helicopters carried by each vessel was up to 19 Sikorsky CH-53 Sea Stallions, 26 Boeing Vertol CH-46 Sea Knight, or a mix of the two. The  flight deck is fitted with two aircraft lifts, and up to nine Sea Stallions or 12 Sea Knights can be operated simultaneously. With a small amount of modification, the ships could carry and operate up to six McDonnell Douglas AV-8B Harrier II jump-jets.

The Tarawa-class ships are designed to embark a reinforced battalion of the United States Marine Corps and their equipment. As well as deploying by helicopters, personnel and equipment can be embarked or offloaded via a  well deck in each ship's stern. Up to four LCU 1610 landing craft can be transported in and operated from the well deck, along with other designs and combinations of landing craft (two LCU and two LCM-8, or 17 LCM-6, or 45 LVT).

The Tarawa design was later repeated for the s, with some changes. The main changes to the latter eight-ship class include the lower placement of the ship's bridge aboard the Wasps, the relocation of the command and control facilities to inside the hull, modifications to allow the operation of Harrier jump-jets and Landing Craft Air Cushion hovercraft, and removal of the 5-inch guns and their sponsons to increase the overall size of the flight deck.

Construction
All five warships were built by Ingalls Shipbuilding, at this company's shipyard in Pascagoula, Mississippi. Tarawa was approved for construction during fiscal year 1969, with two more ships of this class ordered by Congress in the 1970 and 1971 fiscal years.

Design problems emerged early in the LHA program and contrary to the intent of the Total Package Procurement concept, the Navy became heavily involved in the design process. Nine ships were originally contracted for the Tarawa class, but that number was reduced to five in January 1971. The other four ships were never built for the Navy.
 
Work on the first warship of this class, began on 15 November 1971, and she was commissioned into the Navy on 29 May 1976. The last of the five ships, was completed on 3 May 1980.

Decommissioning and replacement

The Tarawas began leaving service in 2005. By April 2011, four of the five amphibious assault ships had been decommissioned, leaving only Peleliu in active service. Peleliu was decommissioned on 31 March 2015 in San Diego.

The first America-class vessel was delivered and commissioned in 2014.

Ships in class

Citations

References

External links

 The USS Tarawa (LHA-1) Amphibious Assault Ship Museum

Amphibious warfare vessel classes
Helicopter carrier classes